Mihkel Järveoja (born 30 April 1986) is an Estonian orienteering competitor and junior world champion.

He was born in Põlva.

He became Junior World Champion in the relay in Druskininkai in 2006, together with Markus Puusepp and Timo Sild.

He has won several medals at Estonian orienteering championships.

References

External links
 
 Mihkel Järveoja at World of O Runners

1986 births
Living people
Estonian orienteers
Male orienteers
Foot orienteers
Hugo Treffner Gymnasium alumni
University of Tartu alumni
People from Põlva